Ryan Lee Stiles (born April 22, 1959) is an American-Canadian actor, comedian, and producer whose work is often associated with improvisational comedy. He is best known for his work on the original British series and American version of Whose Line Is It Anyway? and for his role as Lewis Kiniski on The Drew Carey Show. He also played Herb Melnick on the CBS comedy Two and a Half Men and was a performer on the show Drew Carey's Improv-A-Ganza.

Early life and career
The youngest of five children, Ryan Stiles was born in Seattle to Canadian parents Irene and Sonny Stiles. He grew up with his mother, a homemaker, and his father, a supervisor at a Vancouver-based Canadian fish processing plant. When he was ten, his family moved to Vancouver, British Columbia. Ryan Stiles attended R.C. Palmer Junior Secondary School and Richmond Senior Secondary in Richmond, British Columbia. Although he was a good student, Stiles has admitted that "being a high-school senior gave [him] too much freedom." He got so carried away with his flexible schedule that at age 17, he quit school a few months shy of graduation.

Despite his parents' objections, he was able to support himself doing stand-up routines at clubs near his home in Vancouver. He helped Rich Elwood start Punchlines Comedy Club. During this time he was the head writer of The Don Harron Show on CTV and the host of Comedy College on CBC. Stiles was a regular improv performer with the Vancouver Theatresports League and Punchlines' "No Name Player" before joining the Second City comedy ensemble at Expo 86. He continued performing with Second City in Toronto and later in Los Angeles.

Career

Whose Line Is It Anyway? and The Drew Carey Show
By 1989, Stiles had gained the attention of the producers of the British improvisational comedy show Whose Line Is It Anyway? Stiles was a regular on the show until its end in 1998. His performance on the program earned him both critical praise and a devoted fan following in the United Kingdom. In 1995, Stiles was asked by American comic Drew Carey to be a regular on his comedy The Drew Carey Show. Stiles played Carey's erudite but underachieving best friend, Lewis Kiniski.

In 1998, Carey successfully lobbied ABC to produce an American version of Whose Line Is It Anyway? Following the final season of the British version in 1998, the American version premiered, with both Stiles and Carey credited as executive producers. Stiles received a nomination for the Primetime Emmy Award for Outstanding Individual Performance in a Variety or Music Program in 2002 for his work on the show. A running gag of the show is Stiles' flashy dress shoes.

Though he never appeared in the series, Stiles (along with Kaitlin Olson) performed in the taping of the unaired pilot episode of Drew Carey's Green Screen Show, which involved improv games similar to Whose Line? games played in front of a massive green screen. Animation was later added to the improv footage.

Stiles returned as performer and executive producer for The CW's revival of Whose Line Is It Anyway? in the summer of 2013.

Other television and film work

Stiles appeared in the 1991 film Hot Shots! as Mailman Farnham and starred in its 1993 sequel, Hot Shots! Part Deux, as marine Rabinowitz. He portrayed recurring character Dr. Herb Melnick on Two and a Half Men from 2004 until the show's end in 2015. He made short guest appearances on Parker Lewis Can't Lose, Murphy Brown, Mad About You, Mad TV, and Dharma & Greg. In July 2008, he was a guest star on Reno 911! as Sergeant Clift, an acting coach.

During the 1994 Major League Baseball strike, Stiles appeared in several commercials for Nike, hanging out in an empty ballpark, doing things such as playing the organ and attempting to do the wave alone. The commercials ended with the line: "Play ball. Please."

In 2005, Stiles appeared in the mockumentary Conker: Celebrity Squirrel produced for the promotion of the Xbox video game Conker: Live & Reloaded. This role led to gamers voting to induct him into the 2015 class of the DK Vine Hall of Fame.

Charity work 
Stiles has been a frequent fundraiser for children with burn injuries, raising over $500,000 for the Burned Children Recovery Center since 2009 and helping the foundation to recover from the Great Recession.

Personal life 
In 1981, Stiles met Patricia McDonald at Punchlines where she was a waitress. They married in 1988. They have three children: Sam, Mackenzie, and Claire. 

When not working, he lives at his home on Lake Samish, outside Bellingham, Washington, where he opened the Upfront Theatre, a small theatre dedicated to live improv comedy.

Filmography

Film

Television

Commercials

References

External links 

 

1959 births
Living people
20th-century American comedians
20th-century American male actors
20th-century Canadian comedians
21st-century American comedians
21st-century American male actors
21st-century Canadian comedians
American expatriates in Canada
American impressionists (entertainers)
American male comedians
American male film actors
American male television actors
American stand-up comedians
American male voice actors
Canadian impressionists (entertainers)
Canadian male comedians
Canadian male voice actors
Canadian stand-up comedians
Comedians from Vancouver
Male actors from Vancouver
People from Richmond, British Columbia